Luc-sur-Mer (literally Luc on Sea) is a commune in the Calvados department in the Normandy region in northwestern France.

Population

Sights
 The "Maison de la Baleine" created by Jean Chabriac. On January 15, 1885 a 40-ton and 19 meters long whale beached in Luc sur Mer. Its skeleton is now on display in the municipal park.
 Luc sur Mer cliffs
 The cemetery's cross is estimated to date from 1662

See also
Communes of the Calvados department

References

External links

 Official website (in French)

Communes of Calvados (department)
Calvados communes articles needing translation from French Wikipedia
Populated coastal places in France